The fulvous-crowned scrub tyrant (Euscarthmus meloryphus) is a species of bird in the family Tyrannidae. It is found in Argentina, Bolivia, Brazil, Colombia, Ecuador, Paraguay, Peru, Uruguay, and Venezuela. Its natural habitats are dry savanna, subtropical or tropical dry shrubland, and subtropical or tropical high-altitude shrubland.

References

External links
Image at ADW

Euscarthmus
Birds of South America
Birds described in 1831
Taxonomy articles created by Polbot